Ceyda Kozluca (born May 12, 1984 in İzmit, Turkey) is a Turkish professional female basketball player. She is a shooting guard playing for Adana ASKİ SK.

Career
On 21 July 2010, Galatasaray Medical Park announced that Ceyda had joined the team on a one-year contract.

Awards and achievements
Turkish University National Team -2007
World University Championships in Bangkok -2007
Turkish TBB2L Champion -2009
All-Turkish TBB2L 1st Team -2009

See also
 Turkish women in sports

References

External links
Statistics at Turkish Basketball Federation

1984 births
Living people
Sportspeople from İzmit
Turkish women's basketball players
Shooting guards
Beşiktaş women's basketball players
Galatasaray S.K. (women's basketball) players
Kocaeli Büyükşehir Belediyesi Kağıt Spor athletes
20th-century Turkish sportswomen
21st-century Turkish sportswomen